Abba Aa Hudugi is a 1959 Indian Kannada-language film written, directed and produced by H. L. N. Sinha based on his own play of the same name. It stars Rajashankar in his debut role, Rajkumar in an extended cameo along with Narasimharaju, Mynavathi and Pandari Bai. It is considered a landmark film in Kannada cinema. Critics have noted that the theme of the movie is loosely based on William Shakespeare 's  The Taming of the Shrew. The film was dubbed in Tamil with the title Mangaikku Maangalyame Pradhaanam and was released in 1960. Dialogues were written by S. A. Subbaraman. Jeevan composed the music; while Puratchidasan wrote the lyrics. In short, this film also marked the only Kannada film for Malayalam actress Sukumari.

Plot 

Mynavathi is the arrogant girl, who looks down on men. Rajashankar, plays the protagonist, who marries her, teaches her manners and educates her to behave well. Dr. Rajkumar, who costars, marries the younger sister of Mynavathi. The movie became a trend-setter. P. Kalinga Rao's song "Ba Chinna Mohana Nodenna" became a chart-buster.

Cast 
 Rajkumar as Suresh
 Rajashankar as Sarvottama
 Mynavathi as Sharmishtha
 Pandari Bai as Jyoti
 M. V. Rajamma
 Narasimharaju as Shobh
 B. R. Panthulu
 Dikki Madhava Rao
 H. L. N. Simha
 Advani Lakshmi Devi
 Leelavathi in a guest appearance
 Ramadevi
 Sukumari as dancer

Soundtrack 
Music by P. Kalinga Rao. Lyrics were penned by H. L. N. Simha. Playback singers are P. B. Sreenivas, P. Kalinga Rao, Jikki, S. Janaki, T. S. Bagavathi, Swarnalatha, Mohana Kumari & Sohana Kumari.

Tamil
For the Tamil-dubbed version Mangaikku Maangalyame Pradhaanam, the music was composed by Jeevan. Lyrics were by Puratchidasan & Solai Rasu. Playback singers are P. B. Sreenivas, A. M. Rajah, Jikki, A. P. Komala & K. Rani.

References

External links
 - A song from the Tamil dubbed version of the film

1959 films
1950s Kannada-language films
Indian comedy films
Films based on The Taming of the Shrew
1959 comedy films